Didești is a commune in Teleorman County, Muntenia, Romania. It is composed of three villages: Didești, Însurăței and Satu Nou.

Famous residents include Gala Galaction (1879–1961), writer and theologian.

References

Communes in Teleorman County
Localities in Muntenia